Tom Tachell was an Australian professional tennis player who the 1905 Australian Championships (with Randolph Lycett) in men's doubles

Grand slam finals

Doubles (1 title)

References 

1870s births
Year of death unknown
Australian male tennis players
Grand Slam (tennis) champions in men's doubles
Place of birth missing
Australasian Championships (tennis) champions